The Portland Thorns FC is an American professional women's soccer team based in Portland, Oregon. Established in 2012, the team began play in 2013 in the then-eight-team National Women's Soccer League (NWSL), which receives support from the United States Soccer Federation (USSF). The Portland franchise is owned by Peregrine Sports LLC, which also owns the Portland Timbers. Alongside the Thorns, the Houston Dash and Orlando Pride are other NWSL teams with Major League Soccer affiliations.

In its inaugural season, the Portland Thorns FC placed third during the regular season and, in the playoffs, won the first NWSL championship. The club won the NWSL Shield in 2016 and a second NWSL Championship in 2017. In 2020, they won the Community Shield with the best record in the pandemic-shortened regular season. In 2021, the Thorns won the NWSL Challenge Cup, the Women's International Champions Cup, and the NWSL Shield.  They followed up in 2022 by winning the NWSL championship. 

The Thorns have had the highest average attendance in the league in each of their first seven seasons, and set a league attendance record of 25,218 at an August 11, 2019, match against the North Carolina Courage.

History 

The first professional women's soccer team in Portland was started by the Portland Timbers in 2001, competing alongside teams formed by the Seattle Sounders and Vancouver Whitecaps in the USL W-League's W-1 division. In Portland the team was christened the Portland Rain and played the 2000 season in the Pacific Coast Soccer League (PCSL).  The team played the 2001 season in the W-League before returning to the PCSL until 2003 when the team folded. Women's soccer was also well-supported via the University of Portland Pilots.

The Portland Rain were re-founded in 2009 when they joined the Women's Premier Soccer League (WPSL). On May 2, 2012 the Portland Timbers partnered with the Portland Rain and the Oregon Youth Soccer Association's (OYSA) Girls Olympic Development (ODP) program. This precursor to the NWSL announcement the following November was to facilitate an integrated development structure for Oregon's girls youth soccer to elite women's competition. After the start of the NWSL, in the 2013 WPSL the Portland Rain's spot was replaced by a Timbers Alliance club Westside Timbers and Tualatin Hills United Soccer Club (THUSC) Diamonds. These two teams join the Oregon Rush (2011), now Bend FC Timbers, and Eugene Metro Futbol Club (EMFC in 2012) so Oregon has a total of four WPSL teams at this level of the American soccer pyramid.

NWSL formation 

The formation of the National Women's Soccer League (NWSL) was announced on November 21, 2012, with Portland selected as a host for one of the eight teams. At that time it was announced by Portland Timbers' owner Merritt Paulson that the Timbers would own the team. The team name was announced on December 13, 2012 as the Portland Thorns FC. Also, a logo was unveiled. Both the name and logo were intended to invoke Portland's nickname of the Rose City.

Cindy Parlow Cone was announced as the first head coach on December 19, 2012. On January 11, 2013, the league held its player allocation for the national team players, with Portland receiving seven players, including former University of Portland Pilots star Christine Sinclair. The other players assigned to the Thorns were Rachel Buehler, Tobin Heath, Karina LeBlanc, Alex Morgan, Marlene Sandoval, and Luz Saucedo.

"We are thrilled with today's allocation, and I see this group of seven players as a terrific foundation for this club," said Parlow Cone. Seattle Reign FC general manager Amy Carnell reaction to the NWSL allocation and Morgan's placement was, "I think generally speaking, I could speak for all the clubs when I say I'm extremely surprised they would place (Christine) Sinclair and (Alex) Morgan in the same city. Two of the best strikers in the world in the same city." Carnell said Seattle Reign FC "were a little surprised" they didn't get Morgan, considering that she had spent the previous spring with the Seattle Sounders Women. This reunited Sinclair and Morgan as club mates since winning the regular season and championship title with the Western New York Flash in Women's Professional Soccer's final season.

2013 season 

Under head coach Cindy Parlow Cone, the Thorns played in the new league's inaugural game on April 13, 2013 against host team FC Kansas City, which ended in a 1–1 draw in which Christine Sinclair scored the club's first goal on a penalty kick. The team's first home match on April 21 provided the club its first victory, a 2–1 win over Seattle Reign FC. Beyond setting a new league record, the opening day crowd of 16,479 at Jeld-Wen Field eclipsed any single-game attendance from Women's Professional Soccer. Subsequently, the team's regular-season home finale of 17,619 topped the previous mark of 16,479 and also ranks among the top single-game marks in women's professional soccer history in the United States.

On the road, Thorns FC also were an attendance draw. Portland's road games were witnessed by season-high attendance figures or sellout crowds, including a record-setting crowd at the Maryland SoccerPlex against the Washington Spirit on May 4. A total of 5,011 fans were present, besting the previous record for a women's game at the Soccerplex by more than 300 and about 500 more than normal capacity.

On August 28, 2013, NWSL announced Thorns FC forwards Christine Sinclair, Alex Morgan and defender Rachel Buehler were named to the National Women's Soccer League Best XI Second Team. The club finished in a three-way tie atop the league in the regular season standings, but by virtue of goal differential tiebreaker the club claimed the No. 3 seed in the NWSL playoffs. In the first round of playoffs on August 24, the Thorns beat FC Kansas City 3–2 in extra time. A week later they beat the Western New York Flash 2–0 in the championship game to become the first NWSL Champions.

After the end of the season, Cindy Parlow Cone resigned as head coach on December 5, 2013. She cited personal reasons, particularly the desire of her and her husband, Portland Timbers director of sports science John Cone (who also resigned around the same time), to be together more.

2014 season 

The Thorns kicked off their 2014 season with the announcement of a new head coach, Paul Riley, formerly of the Long Island Fury of the Women's Premier Soccer League. Goalkeeper Karina LeBlanc was traded to the Chicago Red Stars and was replaced with 2013 FIFA World Player of the Year recipient Nadine Angerer. A new NWSL attendance record of 19,123 was set at Providence Park on August 3 in a game between Portland and Houston, breaking the previous record of 17,619 set in the same stadium in 2013. The Thorns finished third in the regular season and were knocked out in the playoff semi-final by FC Kansas City.

2015 season 

The Thorns made a number of roster moves in the offseason. In November 2014 the Thorns traded for defender Kat Williamson and midfielder McCall Zerboni. Williamson appeared in 21 matches (20 starts) during the 2014 regular season for the Western New York Flash. Williamson was traded to the Flash on April 5 as part of a move that granted Portland the right to midfielder Vero Boquete. The eighth overall pick by Portland in the first round of the 2013 National Women's Soccer League College (NWSL) Draft from the University of Florida, Williamson made her professional debut with Thorns FC in 2013 and ranked second on the team in minutes (1,944) during her rookie campaign. 

As part of the National Team player allocation process, Portland received Canada Women's National Team midfielder Kaylyn Kyle and defender Rhian Wilkinson. 

Portland acquired defender Kendall Johnson from Sky Blue FC in exchange for the 25th and 34th overall selections in the 2015 National Women's Soccer League College Draft. A native of Portland and former University of Portland standout, Johnson, 23, appeared in 15 matches (12 starts) for Sky Blue FC during the 2014 regular season, her second season with the team.

Portland acquired forward Jodie Taylor from the Washington Spirit in exchange for a 2015 second-round pick (No. 13 overall) and two-second-round picks in 2016. A standout at Oregon State, Taylor, 28, was one of the top goal scorers in the NWSL in 2014. An England international, Taylor had earned three caps with the England Women's National Team, making her debut in an international friendly against Sweden in August 2014.

Defender Nikki Marshall announced her retirement from professional soccer. Marshall retired after playing four professional seasons, including the last two with the Thorns. In her two seasons with the club, Marshall, 26, appeared in a club-record 46 consecutive regular-season matches, playing 3,943 minutes.

Portland signed international forward Genoveva Añonma. The Equatorial Guinea international was the 10th-ranked goal scorer all-time in Frauen-Bundesliga history and the 2012 African Women Footballer of the Year. Añonman, who goes by Ayo, had played professionally in Germany since 2009. Añonman had appeared in 122 matches in the German league, recording 95 goals during her time with FF USV Jena and 1. FFC Turbine Potsdam.

Portland signed midfielder Sarah Robbins. Robbins appeared in 14 matches, recording three goals and seven assists, for Finnish club Åland United in 2014. The midfielder logged 1,189 minutes for the Naisten Liiga side, and competed in the qualifying round of the 2014–15 UEFA Women's Champions League.

The Thorns finished the 2015 season with 23 points from 20 games and did not reach the playoffs, the first (and to date only) season in which they have failed to do this. At the end of the season, head coach Paul Riley was fired from the position. On September 30, 2021, news reports came out that Riley was relieved from his duties for sexual harassment allegations.

On June 19, 2015, the Thorns made NWSL history when goalkeeper Michelle Betos headed the equalizing goal for 10-woman Portland in the 95th minute against FC Kansas City. This was the first goal scored by a goalkeeper in the league.

On October 5, former Washington Spirit head coach Mark Parsons took over as head coach for 2016.

2016 season 
In Parsons's first season in charge, the Thorns acquired several players including French defensive midfielder Amandine Henry and Danish striker Nadia Nadim. They placed first in the regular season with 41 points, winning the NWSL Shield. In a physical playoff semi-final, they tied Western New York 2–2 during regulation, fell behind 4–2 in overtime, and could score only one more goal to end their season with a 4–3 loss.

2017 season 

After a 14–5–5 league record for 47 points and a second-place finish, the Thorns defeated the Orlando Pride 4–1 in a playoff semi-final. In the championship match, Portland faced the NWSL Shield-winning North Carolina Courage, successor to the Western New York Flash team that had beaten them in the final the year before. Portland defeated the Courage at Orlando City Stadium in a physical 1–0 match to win their second NWSL championship. Following the victory, the team held a victory rally in their home stadium.

2018 season 
The Thorns announced that midfielder Amandine Henry and forward Nadia Nadim would not be returning to the team for the 2018 season. The moves were made for financial reasons, as the NWSL has a strict salary cap of $315,000 for each team and the Thorns could not compete with offers made by Lyon and Manchester City. On January 11, 2018, the team announced a trade that would send midfielder Allie Long to the Seattle Reign. Long had been with the team since its inaugural season, and was one of the first players to reach 100 NWSL appearances with one club. With Long's departure, Tobin Heath and Christine Sinclair would be the only remaining players from the first Thorns season. The Thorns would finish with a regular season record of 12–6–6 and match their second-place finish from the previous season. The team would defeat the Seattle Reign 2–1 in the Semi-final round and would face the shield-winning North Carolina Courage in a rematch of the previous seasons final. The Thorns would lose a lopsided 3–0 to the Courage, who became the first team to win the NWSL Shield and the NWSL Playoffs in the same season.

2019 season 

Prior to the start of the season, it was announced that the Thorns would play their first six games on the road due to ongoing renovation at Providence Park. The Thorns would start the season strong, losing only one of their first six games before going on a run that would see them lose once in a nine-game stretch that spanned June and July. This run included the return of several key players who had missed time for the FIFA Women's World Cup, including Lindsey Horan, the reigning NWSL MVP, and team captain Christine Sinclair. The Thorns fine form was encapsulated by a 5–0 rout of the Houston Dash on July 24. Beginning the month of September at the top of the table and contenders for the NWSL Shield, the team entered what would be the worst run of form since Mark Parsons was named head coach. Portland would lose three of their final five games, including an embarrassing 6–0 loss to the North Carolina Courage which would end up as the most lopsided loss in team history. After finishing the season with a scoreless draw against the Washington Spirit, the Thorns finished third in the league, meaning they would not host a playoff game for the first time since 2015. The Thorns would be knocked out of the playoffs after a 1–0 defeat to the Chicago Red Stars.

2020 season 

Due to the COVID-19 pandemic, on March 12, 2020 the Thorns canceled their preseason tournament, scheduled for March 29-April 4. On March 20, 2020, the NWSL postponed the start of the league's regular season indefinitely. The Thorns participated in the inaugural NWSL Challenge Cup, defeating the North Carolina Courage in the quarterfinals but losing to the eventual champions Houston Dash in the semifinals. The Thorns also participated in and clinched the 2020 NWSL Fall Series Community Shield with a win on October 11, 2020, over OL Reign.

2021 season

Abuse scandal 

In late-September, The Athletic published an investigation into North Carolina Courage head coach Paul Riley, alleging that Riley had sexually coerced and verbally abused players on his teams, including during his two-year tenure as Thorns head coach in 2014 and 2015. More than a dozen players from every team Riley had coached since 2010 spoke to the publication and two named players, both former Thorns, went on the record with allegations against him. In the article, Riley denied the allegations. The article also stated that NWSL failed to act on Riley's alleged abuses multiple times, including earlier in 2021 when the league declined to act on an offer from two of Riley's alleged victims to assist in investigating Riley's alleged abuses. Later that day, the Courage announced that Riley had been fired due to "very serious allegations of misconduct". The Thorns front office released a statement the same day citing that some of the incidents occurred during Riley's two-year tenure as head coach of the Thorns and discussing their reaction to the incidents at the time.

The subsequent fallout resulted in the resignation of league commissioner Lisa Baird and dismissal of league counsel Lisa Levine. A number of Portland Thorns players also released a statement calling for Thorns general manager Gavin Wilkinson to be suspended. Wilkinson was subsequently put on administrative leave from the Thorns, but remained manager of the MLS Portland Timbers. Wilkinson was reinstated in January 2022 following an internal business review, however, due to ongoing league, union, and federation investigations, no players could be interviewed, and the players association disavowed any connection between the internal review and other investigations.

The US Soccer Federation commissioned a league-wide independent investigation into abusive behavior lead by Sally Yates. The report, published on October 3, 2022, indicates that the club "interfered with our access to relevant witnesses and raised specious legal arguments in an attempt to impede our use of relevant documents." The report further details how both Paulson and Wilkinson advised other clubs to hire Riley after his departure from the Thorns. According to the report, Wilkinson "told the Flash that Riley was 'put in a bad position by the player,' and that Wilkinson would 'hire [Riley] in a heartbeat.'" Paulson congratulated the Flash on hiring Riley in an email to club's President, stating "congrats on the Riley hire. I have a lot of affection for him.”  When contacted by NC Courage ownership about hiring Riley, Paulson downplayed the abuse of Portland Thorn's players saying it "basically was [a case of] ‘poor judgment'" and described difficulty managing the roster as the reason for Riley's departure from Portland.

Competitions 

The Thorns competed in and won the West Division of the 2021 NWSL Challenge Cup, advancing from the group stage to host the finals on May 8, 2021, against NJ/NY Gotham FC. After drawing the finals in regulation 1–1, the Thorns defeated Gotham in penalties 6–5 to claim the cup. Morgan Weaver scored the match-winning penalty.

The Thorns qualified for the 2021 Women's International Champions Cup as champions of the 2020 Fall Series, and won the tournament by defeating three-time finalists and defending champions Olympique Lyon 1–0. Morgan Weaver scored the match-winning goal in regulation. Portland also hosted the friendly tournament.

The Thorns clinched their second NWSL Shield on October 17, earning a first-round bye to the 2021 NWSL playoffs, but lost in the semi-finals to the Chicago Red Stars.

Head coach Mark Parsons, who had served since 2016, left the team after the 2021 season to lead the Netherlands women's national football team. His hiring had been announced during the season in May.

2022 season 

The Thorns hired retired former club goalkeeper and Canadian international Karina LeBlanc as Gavin Wilkinson's replacement in the Thorns general manager role on November 2, 2021.

Following Mark Parsons's exit, the Thorns hired one of the club's former players from Paul Riley's tenure, Rhian Wilkinson, as his replacement. Wilkinson had also played on the Canadian national team as a teammate of LeBlanc and longtime Thorns FC and Canadian team captain Christine Sinclair. After her playing career, Wilkinson had been an assistant coach for the Canadian and English national teams.

The defending Challenge Cup champion Thorns failed to advance from the group stage of the 2022 NWSL Challenge Cup's West Division, finishing second to group winners OL Reign.

On December 1, 2022, Merritt Paulson announced that he was selling the team. The next day, Rhian Wilkinson resigned as coach, after reports that she may have become romantically involved with a player.

Colors and crest 

The team's colors were announced as red, green, and black. The team crest was designed by artist and Timbers Army member Brent Diskin. Its design features the team colors of red and white "with a protective wreath of thorns surrounding a familiar, stylized rose in the center." The design also includes a pair of four-pointed stars, or hypocycloids, that house the letters "F" and "C" and anchor the sides of the badge, and resemble the star prominent on Portland's official city flag. The team's home kit is rose red with a white stripe, while the road kit is white. The club unveiled their home and away kits on April 9, 2013. Both uniforms feature sponsorships by Providence Health & Services and Parklane Mattresses, and are made by Nike.

Records

Year-by-year 

DNQ = Did not qualify

Player statistics 
Note: Bold indicates a player still active with the team.

Matches

Goals 
 

Assists

Stadium 

The Portland Thorns play at Providence Park located in the Goose Hollow neighborhood of Portland, Oregon. Providence Park was the third-largest stadium in the NWSL, after the Boston Breakers' Harvard Stadium and the 2014 expansion Houston Dash's BBVA Compass Stadium. However, the Dash closed sections to seat only 7,000 spectators per game in 2014, and in 2015, the Breakers moved to the smaller Soldiers Field Soccer Stadium (now named Jordan Field). This made the 21,144-capacity Providence Park the largest stadium by NWSL-specific capacity until the opening of 25,500-capacity Orlando City Stadium in 2017. Providence Park was enlarged to a capacity of 25,218 in 2019. The Thorns also share the stadium with the Portland Timbers of Major League Soccer.

Players

Squad

Out on loan

Former players 
For details of former players, see :Category:Portland Thorns FC players and List of Portland Thorns FC players.

Head coaches

Broadcasting 

As of April 2017, Thorns games are streamed exclusively by Go90 for American audiences and via the NWSL website for international viewers. For the 2017 season, the Thorns were featured in six nationally televised Lifetime NWSL Game of the Week broadcasts on April 15, April 29, July 15, August 5, August 26, and September 30, 2017.

During the 2013 season, games were streamed online and broadcast on the radio on Freedom 970 AM. Long-time Portland-area sports reporter and broadcaster Ann Schatz was announced as the play-by-play broadcaster, while Angela Harrison, an All-American goalkeeper with the Portland Pilots, was the color analyst. In 2014, Schatz returned, with former Thorns defender Marian Dougherty, who retired after the 2013 season, joining for color commentary.

In 2021, the team struck a multi-year deal with KPTV and KPDX to be its local broadcast partner.

Award Winners
Most Valuable Player

 Sophia Smith: 2022

 Lindsey Horan: 2018

Goalkeeper of the Year
 Adrianna Franch: 2017, 2018
 Michelle Betos: 2015

Coach of the Year
 Mark Parsons: 2016

Best XI First Team
 Sophia Smith: 2022
 Sam Coffey: 2022
 Angela Salem: 2021
 Lindsey Horan: 2018, 2019
 Emily Sonnett: 2018
 Adrianna Franch: 2017, 2018
 Tobin Heath: 2016, 2018, 2019
 Emily Menges: 2016
 Michelle Betos: 2015
 Allie Long: 2015, 2016
 Verónica Boquete: 2014

Best XI Second Team
 Kelli Hubly: 2022
 Becky Sauerbrunn: 2022
 Bella Bixby: 2019
 Emily Sonnett: 2019
 Lindsey Horan: 2017, 2021
 Meghan Klingenberg: 2017, 2021
 Emily Menges: 2017, 2018, 2021
 Stephanie Catley: 2013
 Allie Long: 2013
 Jessica McDonald: 2013
 Rachel Buehler: 2013
 Alex Morgan: 2013
 Christine Sinclair: 2013, 2018

Honors
 NWSL Championship
 Winners (3): 2013, 2017, 2022
 NWSL Shield
 Winners (2): 2016, 2021
 NWSL Challenge Cup
 Winners (1): 2021
 NWSL Community Shield
 Winners (1): 2020
 Women's International Champions Cup
 Winners (1): 2021

See also 

 List of top-division football clubs in CONCACAF countries
 List of professional sports teams in the United States and Canada

References

External links 

 

 
2012 establishments in Oregon
Association football clubs established in 2012
National Women's Soccer League teams
Soccer clubs in Oregon
Portland Timbers
Thorns FC
Women's soccer clubs in the United States